Cranes is an alcoholic beverage made from fermented cranberries made since 2012 by a company based in Cambridgeshire, England. The product is marketed as being a cranberry cider, however technically the product is a fruit wine. The drink is aimed at a younger market.

References

Fruit wines